Gang Rags is the fourth studio album by American rapper Blaze Ya Dead Homie. Released on June 22, 2010, it was produced by Mike E. Clark, and features appearances by guests Kottonmouth Kings, The Dayton Family, Anybody Killa and Insane Clown Posse. One of five different colored bandanas was included in the packaging of each album. Gang Rags debuted at number 52 on the Billboard 200.

Concept
Blaze had been interested in the concept of bringing back the style of the late 1980s to mid 1990s for several years prior to the recording of Gang Rags. He thought that the best way to bring back "the old school [was] in the form of clothing. Gang rags [were] what it was all about back then." Blaze noted that "I may never be a designer or some shit, but I do know my music," so he decided to use the name "Gang Rags" for his next album.

Production
On December 24, 2009, Joseph Bruce revealed through his Twitter account that Gang Rags would be produced by Mike E. Clark. In April, Bruce announced that he would join Clark in producing the album, marking the first time that the two would collaborate on an album by Blaze. Gang Rags also marked the first time that the members of hip hop group Twiztid, Jamie Spaniolo and Paul Methric, did not provide any production on a Blaze album. Bruce and Clark helped Blaze develop new vocal styles, utilizing different voices and rhyme styles. Clark notes that they "tried to do a lot of different stuff on this record." Bruce adds that the album is "still very much Blaze, but ... the sounds and concepts around him have changed."

Bruce praised Clark's production on the album, saying that Clark "makes Blaze sound louder and stronger than he ever has," while Blaze added that Clark "is a genius at his craft. His ear is like no other." Clark attributed the success of the album to the group's ability to work well together. He described Gang Rags as "bangin’, bumpin’, crushin’ & ruthless!," while Blaze said that the album is "some straight dope Juggalo music."

Music and lyrics
Gang Rags fuses late 80s to early 90s West Coast-based gangsta rap with darker lyrical content based in the horrorcore style.

The song "Swine Flu" discusses crooked police officers.
"Dub Sack" follows a drug dealer as he sells baggies of marijuana for 20 dollars apiece, known as dub sacks.
On "Damn Bitch," Blaze and guests The Dayton Family praise the beauty and physical features of their female Juggalette fanbase.
"Monster Inside" reveals the inner turmoil of a man while his sinister inner beast awaits to break free of its mortal shell. The song incorporates guitars in a way that Kik Axe Music reviewer James Zahn says "recalls early Cypress Hill".
In "Party," Blaze and guest Anybody Killa speak about drinking, smoking, and constant partying without any worry of the consequences.
The song "Lights Out" describes what life would be like if the sun never rose. Surrounded by total darkness, panic would arise, people would grow pale and cold, and "the moon would be the new sun."

Release and promotion
The album's title was revealed by Psychopathic Records in December 2009. In promotion of the album, Bruce claimed that Gang Rags "will make a milestone in the career of the Dead Man, no doubt. This is the one. This is the album." The album's release was preceded with a nationwide in-store tour beginning in June, and followed by a 10-day tour. Gang Rags was released in five variant editions, each with its own colored bandana. Each colored bandana represented a fictional gang referenced in the album's lyrics: Red Rage (red), Redemption Ride (white), Zombie King (black), Dollar Domination (green) and Ice Cold Killers (blue).

The first music video from the album, "Dead Man Walking", was released on January 7, 2011. The second music video from the album, "Dub Sack", was released on December 7, 2012.

While on the 2011 Drive-By Tour, Blaze released Gang Rags Extended Version (Uncut + Uncensored), an alternate album recorded during the Gang Rag sessions. The tour-exclusive album features twelve songs originally recorded for Gang Rags. Gang Rags: Reborn, released October 21, 2014 on Majik Ninja Entertainment, derives from much of the same vocal sessions, but contains newly recorded, different music.

Reception

Gang Rags debuted at number 5 on the Billboard Top Independent Albums chart and number 52 on the Billboard 200. Allrovi reviewer David Jeffries gave the album 3.5 out of 5 and praised its production and various musical styles. Jeffries wrote that "Blaze’s gruff delivery bounces off thumping basslines and speaker-ripping electro throughout the album," and that the "Parliament/Funkadelic-styled choruses ... [are] a welcome influence from the rapper and producer’s hometown of Detroit." The album was also favorably received by Kik Axe Music reviewer James Zahn, who called it "one of the best releases from Psychopathic in recent memory". Zahn praised the production of Mike E. Clark and Violent J, and said that the album "could easily break from the underground to attract outside attention."

Track listing

Personnel

Musicians
Anybody Killa - vocals
Axe Murder Boyz - vocals
Blaze - vocals
The Dayton Family - vocals
Kottonmouth Kings - vocals
Michelle Rapp - vocals
Mike E. Clark - arranger, composer, vocals, producer, mixing
Shaggy 2 Dope - vocals
Violent J - composer, vocals, producer

Additional personnel
E-Wolf - photography
Jim Kissling - mastering
Jim Neve - bandana design, cover design, layout

Chart positions

References

2010 albums
Albums produced by Mike E. Clark
Blaze Ya Dead Homie albums